The Best of the Wailers is the fourth studio album by the Wailers, released in August 1971. Despite its title, it is not a compilation album. The album was recorded in May 1970 (prior to the band's involvement with Lee Perry) but not released until August 1971.

The album was produced by Leslie Kong, who died of a heart attack at the age of 37, a week after the album was released.

Track listing
All songs written by Bob Marley, except where noted.

Original album (1971)

The Definitive Remastered edition (2004)

Personnel
The Wailers
 Bob Marley – vocals
 Peter Tosh – vocals, melodica
 Bunny Livingstone – vocals

Additional musicians
Beverley's All Stars:
 Gladstone Anderson – piano
 Winston Wright – organ
 Paul Douglas – drums
 Jackie Jackson – bass
 Lloyd Parks – bass
 Lynford "Hux" Brown – guitar
 Radcliffe "Rad" Bryan – guitar
 Lynn Taitt – guitar

Production
 Leslie Kong – producer
 Warwick Lyn – producer

References

Bob Marley and the Wailers albums
1971 albums
Albums produced by Leslie Kong